The 43° Targa Florio was a motor race for sportscars held on 24 May 1959 on the Circuito Piccolo delle Madonie, Sicily, Italy. It was the second round of the 1959 F.I.A. World Sports Car Championship and the 43rd running of the Targa Florio. Early that year, the event founder, Vincenzo Florio died and his nephew Vincent Paladion promised to keep alive Florio's Targa. “The Targa must continue... Promise me!..”  

The race was won by Edgar Barth and Wolfgang Seidel driving a Porsche 718 RSK entered by Porsche KG.

Report

Entry

The event attracted fewer cars than in previous years, with 59 racing cars registered for this event, instead of the 81 in 1958. Of the 59 cars registered, 58 arrived for practice with 52 qualifying for and starting the race.

Reigning champions, Ferrari had entered three of their latest 250 TR 59 for their squad of drivers; Phil Hill, Dan Gurney, Tony Brooks, Olivier Gendebien, Jean Behra and Cliff Allison. As Aston Martin elected to miss the event, there was no other entrants in the S3.0 class, therefore their main opposition would come from the works Porsches of Jo Bonnier, Wolfgang von Trips, Edgar Barth and Wolfgang Seidel, but these were smaller engined cars and less powerful.

Race

This was meant to be a Ferrari battle, but it was not to be, as all the Ferraris retired due to mechanical problems. This left Porsche alone to command the race, taking the top four places. Their only issue was the leading Porsche 718 of Bonnier and von Trips being forced to withdraw on the last lap.

Porsche recorded their first win in the World Sportscar Champions, with the pairing of Barth/Seidel. They took an impressive victory, with their 718 RSK completing 14 laps, covering 626.343 miles in just over 11 hours of racing, averaging a speed of 56.737 mph. Second place went to the second Porsche of Eberhard Mahle, Paul Ernst Strähle and Herbert Linge in a Porsche 550 RS, albeit 20 mins adrift. The podium was complete by another works Porsche, this time a 356A Carrera of Antonio Pucci and Huschke von Hanstein who were further 9 mins behind, the first GT car to finish. Surprisingly, the fourth car home was driven by the same crew that finished second.

The result meant Porsche took the lead in the World Championship standing. This was the first time Ferrari had not topped the standings since March 1957.

Official Classification

Class Winners are in Bold text.

 Fastest Lap: Jo Bonnier, 43:01.6secs (62.147 mph)

Class Winners

Standings after the race

Note: Only the top five positions are included in this set of standings.

Championship points were awarded for the first six places in each race in the order of 8-6-4-3-2-1. Manufacturers were only awarded points for their highest finishing car with no points awarded for positions filled by additional cars. Only the best 3 results out of the 5 races could be retained by each manufacturer. Points earned but not counted towards the championship totals are listed within brackets in the above table.

References

Further reading

Ed Heivink. Targa Florio: 1955-1973. Reinhard Klein.  

Targa Florio
Targa Florio
Targa Florio